The following is a list of African-American holders of public office from 1900 to 1959. This period saw setbacks for African Americans following the Reconstruction era after "Redeemer" Democrats retook control of the South and restored white supremacy in government. African-Americans were largely barred from voting and almost entirely obstructed from public office in former Confederate states under the Jim Crow regime. The number of African American officeholders would dramatically increase following the passage of the Civil Rights Act of 1964. 

Notably, Minnie Buckingham Harper became the first African-American woman to serve in a state legislature when she was appointed in 1928 to serve out the remainder of her husband's term in the West Virginia House of Delegates. Crystal Bird Fauset was the first Black woman elected to a legislature when was elected to the Pennsylvania House in 1938.

Federal office

House of Representatives
 Oscar Stanton De Priest (1929-1953)
 Arthur Wergs Mitchell (1935-1943)
 William L. Dawson (1943-1970)
 Adam Clayton Powell Jr. (1945-1971)
 Charles Diggs (1955-1980)
 Robert N. C. Nix Sr. (1958-1979)

State office

Alaska

House
 Blanche McSmith (1959)

California

Assembly
 Frederick Madison Roberts (1918)
 Augustus Hawkins (1934-1960)

Colorado

Senate
 George L. Brown (1957)

House
 George L. Brown (1955)

Connecticut

House
 Wilfred X. Johnson (1958), the Wilfred X. Johnson House where he lived is listed on the National Register of Historic Places

Delaware

House
 William J. Winchester (1948)

Georgia

House
 H. F. McKay, state representative from Liberty County (1900-1901) 
 Lectured Crawford, state representative from McIntosh County (1886-1887, 1890–1891, 1900–1901)
 W. H. Rogers, state representative from McIntosh County (1902-1908)
Amos Rogers
Hercules Wilson
Anthony Wilson, state representative from Camden County, Georgia (1884-1888?)
Frasier, first name unknown, state representative from Liberty County, Georgia
Samuel A. McIvor, state representative for Liberty County, Georgia

Illinois

Senate
 Adelbert H. Roberts (1924)
 William E. King (1934)
 William A. Wallace (1938)
 Christopher C. Wimbish (1942)
 Fred J. Smith (1954)

House
 John G. Jones (1900)
 Edward D. Green (1904)
 Alexander Lane (1907)
 Robert R. Jackson (1912)
 Sheadrick B. Turner (1914)
 Benjamin H. Lucas (1916)
 Warren B. Douglass (1918)
 George T. Kersey (1922)
 Charles A. Griffin (1924)
 William J. Warfield (1928)
 Charles J. Jenkins (1930)
 Harris B. Gaines (1930)
 Aubrey H. Smith (1934)
 Ernest A. Greene (1936)
 Richard A. Harewood (1936)
 Andrew A. Torrence (1938)
 Dudley S. Martin (1940)
 Corneal A. Davis (1943)
 Christopher C. Wimbish (1943)
 Charles T. Sykes (1944)
 Edward A. Welters (1944)
 Kenneth E. Wilson (1954)
 William H. Robinson (1954)
 J. Horace Gardner (1956)
 Elwood Graham (1956)
 Floy Clements (1958)
 Cecil A. Partee (1957)
 Charles F. Armstrong (1957)

Indiana

Senate
 Robert Brokenburr (1940)

House
 Harry H. Richardson (1932)
 Robert L. Stanton (1932)
 Marshall A. Talley (1932)
 James S. Hunter (1940)
 Jesse L. Dickinson (1942, 1944)
 Wilbur H. Grant (1942)

Kansas

House
 W. M. Blount (1929-1930, 1933–1936)
 William H. Towers (1937-1939)

Kentucky

House
 Charles W. Anderson (1936)

Maryland

Senate
 Harry A. Cole (1955-1966)

House
 Emory Cole (1955)
 Truly Hatchett (1955)
 Verda Welcome (1958 )
 Irma George Dixon (1958 )

Massachusetts

House
 William H. Lewis (1902)

Michigan

Senate
 Charles A. Roxborough (1930)
 Charles Diggs Sr. (1937-1944)
 Cora Brown (1952)

House
 James W. Ames (1901)
 Horace A. White (1941)
 Charline White (1950)

Missouri

House
 Walthall M. Moore (1921)
 Edwin F. Kenswil (1943)
 William A. Massingale (1947-1948)
 Walter V. Lay (1949-1954)
 James Troupe Sr. (1954)

Nebraska

Senate, then Unicameral Legislature
 John Adams Jr. (1937)

House (prior to 1937)
 T. L. Barnett (1924)
 A. A. McMillan (1924)
 John Andrew Singleton (1927)
 Johnny Owen (1933)
 John Adams Jr. (1935)

New Jersey

General Assembly
 Walter G. Alexander (1920)
 Oliver Randolph (1922)
 James L. Baxter (1927)
 Frank S. Hargrave (1930-1931, 1933–1935, 1937-?, 1938–1942)
 J. Mercer Burrell (1933-1937)
 Guy R. Moorehead (1937-)
 James Otto Hill (1943-1947)
 Madaline A. Williams (1957)

New York

Senate
 Julius A. Archibald (1953)

State Assembly
 Edward A. Johnson (1917)
 John C. Hawkins (1919)
 Henri W. Shields (1922)
 Pope B. Billups (1925)
 Lamar Perkins (1930)
 Francis E. Rivers (1930)
 James E. Stevens (1930)
 William T. Andrews (1934)
 Robert W. Justice (1935)
 Daniel Burrows (1938)
 Hulan E. Jack (1940)
 William E. Prince (1944)
 Bessie A. Buchanan (1955)

Ohio

Senate

House
 George W. Hayes (1901)
 H.T. Eubanks (1904)
 A. Lee Beaty (1919)
 Henry Higgins (1919)
 Harry E. Davis (1921)
 E.W.B. Curry (1924)
 Perry B. Jackson (1928)
 Chester K. Gillespie (1933-1935, 1943–1945)
 Richard P. McClain (1934)
 David D. Turpeau (1940)
 Sandy F. Ray (1942)
 Jacob Ashburn Sr. (1944)

Oklahoma

House
 A. C. Hamlin (1908)

Pennsylvania

House
 Harry W. Bass (1911)
 John C. Asbury (1920)
 Andrew F. Stephens (1920)
 William H. Fuller (1924)
 Samuel B. Hart (1924)
 Walter E. Tucker (1930)
 John William Harris (1932)
 Homer S. Brown (1934)
 Richard A. Cooper (1934)
 Walter K. Jackson (!934)
 Hobson R. Reynolds (1935-1936, 1939–1940)
 Marshall L. Shephard (1935-1938, 1941–1942)
 William A. Allmond (1936)
 John H. Brigerman (1937-1938, 1943–1944)
 Samuel D. Holmes (1936)
 Edwin F. Thompson (1936)
 E. Washington Rhodes (1938)
 Crystal Bird Fauset (1938)
 Ralph T. Jefferson (1940)
 Edward C. Young (1940)
 Dennie W. Hoggard (1943-1946, 1949–1954)
 Lewis W. Mintess (1943-1944, 1947–1952)
 Thomas P. Trent (1943-1946, 1950–1951)
 Lee P. Myhan (1945-1946)
 J. Thompson Pettigrew (1945-1946, 1949–1956)

Vermont

House
 William J. Anderson (1944)

Washington

House
 John H. Ryan (1933)
 Charles Stokes

West Virginia

House
 James M. Ellis (1902)
 Howard Railey (1904)
 Ebenezer Howard Harper (1917)
 Harry J. Capehart (1919–1925)
 Minnie Buckingham Harper (1928, appointed)

Wisconsin

Assembly
 Lucian H. Palmer (1906)
 Cleveland Moland Colbert (1942), elected but decertified after recount
 Leroy J. Simmons (1944)

Local office

Illinois
 Oscar Stanton De Priest, Cook County Board of Commissioners (1904–1908), Chicago City Council (1915–1917, 1943–1947)
 Louis B. Anderson, Chicago City Council (1923-1933)
 William L. Dawson, Chicago City Council (1933-1939)
 Earl B. Dickerson, Chicago City Council (1939-1943)
 Claude Holman, Chicago City Council (1955-1973)

Michigan
 William T. Patrick, Detroit City Council (1957-1963)

New York
 Adam Clayton Powell Jr., New York City Council (1942-1945)
 Benjamin J. Davis Jr., New York City Council (1945-1949)

Ohio
 Thomas W. Fleming, Member, Cleveland City Council

References

African-American politicians